Operation Mad Ball is a 1957 military comedy from Columbia Pictures, produced by Jed Harris, directed by Richard Quine, that stars Jack Lemmon, Ernie Kovacs, Kathryn Grant, Arthur O'Connell, and Mickey Rooney. The screenplay is by Blake Edwards, Jed Harris, and Arthur Carter, based on an unproduced play by Carter.

Plot
Following World War II in 1945, at a U.S. Army hospital unit in France, Pvt. Hogan does not believe that a blue-stocking can ever be good-looking. Catching first sight of new arrival nurse Lt. Betty Bixby convinces him otherwise. He picks up her dropped cigarette lighter after putting aside his M-1 rifle. He is seen by security officer Capt. Paul Locke, who admonishes him for doing so while Hogan is standing night guard duty. Locke confines him to quarters preliminary to a court martial. The colonel in charge of the hospital, however, would prefer to keep everything "in the family" and avoid a court martial. He knows it would be bad for camp morale and discipline, their unit being close to being sent back to the U.S. for discharge from the service.

Hogan begins to organize a ball at an off-limits hotel before their unit disbands. This will be to benefit all the camp's nurse officers and his fellow enlisted soldiers (men being men and women being women), in spite of army regulations. Hogan uses a General's X-ray to pretend that it belongs to him in order to win the sympathy and attention of nurse Lt. Bixby, whom he wants to take to the ball. Hogan claims to be suffering from heartburn and an ulcer, and Bixby recommends necessary changes to his diet. When Bixby finds out that the X-ray doesn't belong to him, she falls out with Hogan, leaving both of them secretly sad to have lost each other.

Hogan and Cpl. Bohun go through all sorts of mishaps to make sure that the plan for the secret ball goes ahead. What follows in the coming days is constant wheeling-and-dealing and complex maneuvering by Hogan and soon other of his fellow camp soldiers. As the various details surrounding the ball grow larger and become ever more complex, their efforts evolve into a "Mad Ball" that no one will likely ever forget ... if Hogan and his men can carry it off. On their heels every minute, however, is security officer Locke, always sniffing around and on the lookout for the slightest breach of what constitutes his ideas of strict army regulations and military discipline. Along the way, Hogan and his men jump through many hoops to distract Locke. Hogan finally sidelines Locke just before their blowout event happens.

The night of the Big Ball, each soldier is paired with each nurse, except Hogan. He waits for Bixby, hoping that she has forgiven him, but he ends up disappointed, going to the ball without her. When he arrives at the hotel, he sees Bixby sitting with the camp's commanding officer, who has sworn to everyone at the ball to say nothing about what is going on that evening. When Bixby sees Hogan, she takes off her long military coat to reveal a pretty dress, and she shares a first dance with Hogan. Meanwhile, the band plays a hot number and the Mad Ball swirls around everyone non-stop, going on and on and on, it now a complete success ...

Cast
 Jack Lemmon as Private Hogan
 Ernie Kovacs as Captain Locke
 Kathryn Grant as Lieutenant Betty Bixby
 Arthur O'Connell as Colonel Rousch
 Mickey Rooney as Sergeant Yancy Skibo
 Dick York as Corporal Bohun
 Jeanne Manet as Madame LaFour
 James Darren as Private Widowskas
 Roger Smith as Corporal Berryman
 Marilyn Hanold as Lieutenant Tweedy
 L.Q. Jones as Ozark
 William Leslie as Private Grimes
 David McMahon as Sergeant Pringle
 William Hickey as Private Sampson
 Stacy Graham as Lieutenant Rosedale
 Bebe Allen as Lieutenant Johnson
 Sheridan Comerate as Sergeant Wilson
 Dick Crockett as Sergeant McCloskey
 Betsy Jones-Moreland as Lieutenant Bushey

Cast notes
This film marks the first time that Jack Lemmon received top billing in a film, and was also the first major screen role for Ernie Kovacs.

Awards and honors
 1958 Golden Laurel Award - 2nd place - Top Male Comedy Performance - Jack Lemmon
 1958 WGA Award (Screen) - Nominated - Best Written American Comedy - Arthur Carter, Jed Harris, Blake Edwards

See also
 List of American films of 1957

References

External links 
 
 
 
 
 Operation Mad Ball Trailer-1957-Internet Archive

Films directed by Richard Quine
1957 films
1957 comedy films
American comedy films
Military humor in film
1950s English-language films
Columbia Pictures films
Films scored by George Duning
1950s American films